George Smith (15 December 1895 – 29 March 1967) was a British mycologist. Born in Great Harwood (Lancashire, England), he graduated from the University of Manchester in 1916 with first-class honours, and received his Master's degree in chemistry two years later. After starting a laboratory with the textile manufacturing company Boardman and Baron Ltd. in 1919, he began to study the mildew and moulds that grew on goods made from cotton.

Smith began employment as a research assistant to Harold Raistrick in 1930 with the Biochemistry Department of the London School of Hygiene & Tropical Medicine, and worked there until his retirement in 1961. He is known for his monographs on the fungal genera Paecilomyces and Scopulariopsis. Smith also wrote a popular textbook, Introduction to Industrial Mycology, first published in 1939, that was reprinted six times. Smith was the President of the British Mycological Society in 1945, and its foray secretary in 1947 and in 1951–52.

Selected publications

Articles

Books and monographs

Taxa described
Aspergillus brevipes (1952)
Aspergillus parrulus (1961)
Aspergillus restrictus (1931)
Phialophora calyciformis (1962)
Polypaecilum (1961)

See also
List of mycologists

References

1895 births
1967 deaths
British Mycological Society
English mycologists
Alumni of the University of Manchester